It's Hard to be a Jew (Yiddish: Shver tsu zayn a yid) is a 1920 Yiddish-language comedy play by Sholom Aleichem about the difficulty of Jewish-Gentile relationships in the Russian Empire. It was premiered at The Yiddish Art Theatre, Second Avenue, New York on 1 October 1920, and revived in 1949. The play was adapted at the Eden Theater in 1973 with new melodies by Sholom Secunda.

References

1920 plays
Plays set in the Russian Empire
Sholem Aleichem
Yiddish plays